Kim Hyun-Sung (born 27 September 1989) is a South Korean football forward.

He has also played for FC Seoul, Daegu FC, and the Japanese club Shimizu S-Pulse. He represented South Korea in men's football at the 2012 Summer Olympics in London, winning a bronze medal.

Club career 

Kim, a product of FC Seoul's youth academy, was elevated to the club's senior squad for the 2009 season, along with a number of other graduates of the academy. However, he failed to appear in a match for FC Seoul in the K League, and for the 2010 season he was loaned to Daegu FC to gain first team experience. He debuted in Daegu's win over Busan IPark in the League Cup on 6 June 2010. His debut in the K-League itself came a month later in a match against Jeonbuk Hyundai Motors, when he came on as a substitute. Remaining with Daegu for the 2011 season, Kim was firmly established in the side, playing all but four K-league matches during the season as well as scoring seven goals. At the end of the 2011 season, his loan agreement expired and Kim returned to FC Seoul.

On 13 January 2016, Kim Hyun-sung joined Busan IPark.

Club statistics

International career
Since 2011, Kim has been a member of the South Korea U-23 team, playing a number of qualifier matches for the Olympics, as well as the 2012 King's Cup, an annual tournament held in Thailand. He played in the Football at the 2012 Summer Olympics and was a bronze medalist.

References

External links 

1989 births
Living people
Association football forwards
South Korean footballers
South Korean expatriate footballers
J1 League players
K League 1 players
K League 2 players
FC Seoul players
Daegu FC players
Busan IPark players
Shimizu S-Pulse players
Seongnam FC players
Pohang Steelers players
Expatriate footballers in Japan
South Korean expatriate sportspeople in Japan
Footballers at the 2012 Summer Olympics
Olympic footballers of South Korea
Olympic medalists in football
Olympic bronze medalists for South Korea
Medalists at the 2012 Summer Olympics
People from Suwon
Sportspeople from Gyeonggi Province